The Pointe de la Grande Vigie is the northernmost point of the island of Grande-Terre in  Guadeloupe and, as such, is also the northernmost point of Guadeloupe as a whole.

Exposed to trade winds and sea spray, it has scanty and xerophytic vegetation, and it has been the site of almost no construction. Its coastal escarpment makes access by sea difficult.

In clear weather, the Pointe de la Grande Vigie offers impressive views of Grande-Terre's lowlands to the south and of the islands of Montserrat, 80 kilometres to the northwest; Antigua, 70 kilometres to the north; and La Désirade, 50 kilometres to the southeast.

External links 

 Office de tourisme d'Anse Bertrand — Official site of Anse-Bertrand Tourism Board

Landforms of Guadeloupe